Jhampodad is a village and former Rajput petty princely state on the Saurashtra peninsula, in Gujarat, western India.

History 
The princely state, in Jhalawar prant, was ruled by Jhala Rajputs.

In 1901 it comprised only the single village, with a population of 451, yielding 3400 Rupees state revenue (1903-4, all from land), paying 138 Rupees tribute to the British.

References

Princely states of Gujarat
Rajput princely states